Buxton is a rural locality in the Bundaberg Region, Queensland, Australia.

Geography 
The locality of Buxton is bounded to the north and north-east by the Gregory River and to the south by the Isis River and south-east by the Burrum River. Its western boundary is the North Coast railway line.

The Burrum Coast National Park runs from north to south through the centre of the locality.

History 
Buxton has been formerly known as Buxtonville, Newport, and Burrumba. It was originally proposed to be a river port with customs and quarantine facilities but that development never occurred.

The Dundaburra group of the Northern Kabi Kabi Tribe inhabited the area. Burmumba is the name for the mouth of the river and where the three rivers meet.

Amenities 
The town has a general store, a transfer station, a boat ramp and some picnic facilities. There are also a few holiday houses up for rent during the holidays. The community is serviced by the Isis District State High School in Childers.

Recreation 
Boat enthusiasts are able to explore four river systems from this area. Flanking the main road into Buxton are a number of rural homesteads. Those on the southern side of the road have river frontage. The area is known as having some of the best fishing, prawn and crabbing waterways in the south east. There have been some sightings of sharks and rays over the past ten or so years.

Transport 
The Isis Junction railway station is on the south-western edge of the locality. It was the junction of the former Isis railway line to Childers.

References

Towns in Queensland
Bundaberg Region
Localities in Queensland